Louisa Elizabeth Miller, better known as Lulu Miller, is an American writer and Peabody Award-winning science reporter for National Public Radio. Miller's career in radio started as a producer for the WNYC program Radiolab. She helped create the NPR show Invisibilia with Alix Spiegel.

Biography
The daughter of two professors, one in sciences and one in humanities, Miller attended Swarthmore College where she received the Beik Prize for a research paper titled, "The Troubles By Our Women: The Urban Male Perspective on Independent Women in Independent Nigeria" in 2005. She graduated with a degree in history.

Career
After college, she moved to Brooklyn, New York, where an interest in sculpture led her to answer a craigslist ad from a woodworker who was seeking an assistant. She spent her hours at the woodworking shop listening to the radio, and toward the end of her year working there, she heard Radiolab, which was then a local show on WNYC. She fell in love with the show and wrote them a letter, asking if she could volunteer. She started as an intern, going in one day a week to answer emails and record CDs, and eventually became the show's first hired audio producer. RadioLab won a Peabody award in 2010, while she was one of its producers.

After five years at Radiolab, Miller left to pursue her passion as a writer via a fellowship position at the University of Virginia (UVA) where she taught and wrote fiction. Before moving to Virginia, she spent a summer cycling across the United States, a trip that she documented and featured parts of on Radiolab.

After her two years at UVA, Miller returned to radio as a freelance journalist for NPR's Science Desk. On a trip to the Third Coast International Audio Festival in Chicago, she met former This American Life producer Alix Spiegel who asked Miller to produce a piece she was working on. The two began working on radio stories together and began to conceive a new long-form radio show that would become Invisibilia. Launched in January 2015, the show focuses on "the unseen forces that control human behavior." Excerpts of Invisibilia were featured on All Things Considered, Morning Edition, Radiolab and This American Life helping it to debut at #1 on the iTunes podcast chart and hold a consistent top-ten ranking in the months following its launch.

In 2020, she published Why Fish Don't Exist, a personal memoir incorporating the life and work of David Starr Jordan.

Following the retirement of Jad Abumrad in January 2022, Miller became the new co-host of Radiolab together with producer Latif Nasser.

Personal life
Miller openly admits to being an ophidiophobe, a person with an irrational fear of snakes. She is married to Grace Miller and they have two sons.

References

Living people
Year of birth missing (living people)
American radio producers
Swarthmore College alumni
NPR personalities
American women non-fiction writers
21st-century American women writers
Women radio producers